The Battle of Great Cacapon — also known as Mercer's Massacre — was fought on April 18, 1756 between members of Colonel George Washington's Virginia Regiment and French-allied Shawnee and  Delaware Indians. Captain Mercer and a company of his men were pursuing some Indians when they were ambushed by a larger number of Indian raiders. Mercer and at least 16 of his men were killed.

Background

Following the outbreak of the French and Indian War in 1754, and the failure of British General Edward Braddock's expedition in 1755, French commanders in the Ohio Country encouraged their Indian allies to raid British colonial settlements.  Northwestern Virginia (an area including what is now the state of West Virginia) was one area subjected to frequent Indian raids.  In an attempt to defend against these raids, Virginia Governor Robert Dinwiddie ordered a series of defensive fortifications to be constructed.  These forts were manned by members of Virginia provincial militia under the overall command of Colonel George Washington.

Battle
A Delaware leader named Bemino, known as John Killbuck to the whites, a number of years after the incident, described how he and a band of Indians (probably composed of Delawares and Shawnee) killed two men near Fort Edwards, not far from the Cacapon River in what is now Hampshire County, West Virginia.  Deliberately leaving a trail of corn meal, they established an ambush along a high stream bank.  Captain John Mercer led a band of militia (said to number from forty to one hundred, depending on sources) in pursuit.  When they passed the concealed Indians, the trap was sprung, and the Indians opened a murderous crossfire, killing Mercer and 16 men.  More of the militia were chased down and killed, with Killbuck claiming that only six men escaped.

Indians continued to raid in the area throughout the war.

References

 Cartmell, Thomas Kemp (1909), Shenandoah Valley Pioneers and their Descendants
 Kercheval, Samuel; Faulkner, Charles James; Jacob, John Jeremiah. A history of the valley of Virginia
 Lucier, Armand French and Indian War Notices Abstracted from Colonial Newspapers: 1756-1757
 West Virginia Archives. Biennial report of the Department of Archives and History of the State of West Virginia, 1911

External links
 
 https://web.archive.org/web/20131221124712/http://ns1763.ca/remem/7yw-timeline-w.html
 Battle of Great Cacapon?  Where Exactly?

Battles of the French and Indian War
1756 in France
Conflicts in 1756
Battles involving Great Britain
Battles involving France
Battles in West Virginia
Pre-statehood history of West Virginia
Pre-statehood history of Virginia
Battle of Great Cacapon
1756 in North America